Rural Workers' Organisations Convention, 1975 is  an International Labour Organization Convention.

It was established in 1975:
Having decided upon the adoption of certain proposals with regard to organisations of rural workers and their role in economic and social development, ...

Ratifications
As of 2022, the convention has been ratified by 41 states.

External links 
Text.
Ratifications.

International Labour Organization conventions
Treaties concluded in 1975
Treaties entered into force in 1977
Treaties of the Democratic Republic of Afghanistan
Treaties of Albania
Treaties of Austria
Treaties of Belgium
Treaties of Belize
Treaties of Brazil
Treaties of Burkina Faso
Treaties of Costa Rica
Treaties of Cuba
Treaties of Cyprus
Treaties of Denmark
Treaties of Ecuador
Treaties of El Salvador
Treaties of France
Treaties of Finland
Treaties of West Germany
Treaties of Greece
Treaties of Guatemala
Treaties of Guyana
Treaties of Hungary
Treaties of India
Treaties of Israel
Treaties of Italy
Treaties of Kenya
Treaties of Mali
Treaties of Malta
Treaties of Mexico
Treaties of Moldova
Treaties of the Netherlands
Treaties of Nicaragua
Treaties of Norway
Treaties of the Philippines
Treaties of Poland
Treaties of Spain
Treaties of Sweden
Treaties of Switzerland
Treaties of the United Kingdom
Treaties of Uruguay
Treaties of Venezuela
Treaties of Zambia
Rural society
Treaties extended to Aruba
Treaties extended to French Guiana
Treaties extended to French Polynesia
Treaties extended to Guadeloupe
Treaties extended to Martinique
Treaties extended to New Caledonia
Treaties extended to Réunion
Treaties extended to Saint Pierre and Miquelon
Treaties extended to the Falkland Islands
Treaties extended to Guernsey
Treaties extended to British Hong Kong
1975 in labor relations